Sofia Ivanovna Beketova (later Bazylnikova, born 1 June 1948) is a retired Russian rower who won European titles in the eight boat class in 1971 and 1973.

In 1967 Beketova graduated from the Murom Institute of Radio Engineering and moved to Novgorod, to work at a factory Volna. There she started training in rowing. She retired around 1977 and soon gave birth to twins. Years later, she resumed competing and won three world titles in the masters category.

References

External links
 

1948 births
Living people
Russian female rowers
Soviet female rowers
People from Veliky Novgorod
Sportspeople from Novgorod Oblast
European Rowing Championships medalists